Bridport is a town in Dorset, England.

Bridport may also refer to:


Places
Bridport (UK Parliament constituency)
Bridport, Tasmania, Australia
Bridport, Vermont, United States

People
 Viscount Bridport and Baron Bridport, including a list of people with the title(s)
 Giles of Bridport  (13th century), Bishop of Salisbury
 John de Bridport (12th–13th century), Archdeacon of Totnes

Other uses
HMS Bridport, several British ships
Bridport F.C., a football club

See also
 
 Bridgeport (disambiguation)